Craig Gerber may refer to:

Craig Gerber (creator) of Disney animated series
Craig Stuart Gerber, baseball player